Juan Sebastián Cabal and Robert Farah were the defending champions, but did not participate.

Guillermo Durán and Andrés Molteni won the title, defeating Nicolás Barrientos and Eduardo Struvay 7–5, 6–7(8–10), [10–0] in the final.

Seeds

Draw

Draw

References
 Main Draw

Claro Open Bucaramanga - Doubles
2015 Doubles